Serratella levis is a species of spiny crawler mayfly in the family Ephemerellidae. It is found in North America.

References

Mayflies
Articles created by Qbugbot
Insects described in 1954